Kallaroo is one of the four 'Whitfords' suburbs in Perth that resulted from the Western Australian Government rezoning large areas of coastal land for development in 1969.

Kallaroo was chosen as a suburb name in 1970 and is an Aboriginal word meaning ‘road to the water’. The suburb is home to one primary school, Springfield Primary School, which was named after the original housing estate.  The school was established in 1972, with four demountable classrooms and 179 students. A permanent school was built for the 1973 educational year with six classrooms in the main building. Also in the construction was an administrative  and library buildings. The new school oval was sand and limestone rocks for the first year and after many student injuries, a new grassed oval was ready for the 1974 educational year.
Street names in the Kallaroo are predominantly after shipwrecks, including famous West Australian shipwrecks, such as the Batavia.

The land west of Dampier Avenue was developed during the mid-late 1980s and, although part of Kallaroo, is known as Northshore, in reference to the project name of the housing estate.

References

Suburbs of Perth, Western Australia
Suburbs in the City of Joondalup